The Candy Kid may refer to:

 The Candy Kid (1917 film)
 The Candy Kid (1928 film)